John P. Crozer II Mansion, also known as the Allcutt Property, is a historic mansion located at Upland, Delaware County, Pennsylvania, United States. It was built in 1879–1880, and is a three-story mansion house built entirely of California redwood. An addition was built in 1907.  It reflects grandiose Victorian tastes, with elements of the Gothic and Queen Anne styles.  The mansion was divided into eight apartments. Also on the property are a contributing carriage house, barn, trophy house, spring house, remains of greenhouses, a root cellar, and ice house.

It was added to the National Register of Historic Places in 1980.

References

Houses on the National Register of Historic Places in Pennsylvania
Gothic Revival architecture in Pennsylvania
Queen Anne architecture in Pennsylvania
Houses completed in 1880
Houses in Delaware County, Pennsylvania
National Register of Historic Places in Delaware County, Pennsylvania